Aadel Kardooni (born 17 May 1968 in Tehran) is a British-Iranian former professional rugby union player.

He is the first Iranian rugby union player to ever play professionally.

Playing career
Iranian born Aadel left his homeland to avoid national service, and eventually wound up in Leicester where he became Tigers' long-serving scrum half. A very agile scrum half with a bullet pass, Aadel was a regular in the Midlands and England A squads but a full cap eluded him throughout his career. Aadel could always be relied on throughout the early to mid nineties but struggled when the game became professional, and slipped down the pecking order behind Austin Healey and Jamie Hamilton before moving on to pastures new. His last appearance in a Tigers shirt was as a late substitution in the Pilkington Cup final triumph over Sale in 1997.

References

Leicester Tigers players
Wasps RFC players
Bedford Blues players
Blackheath F.C. players
Iranian rugby union players
English rugby union players
Rugby union scrum-halves
Iranian emigrants to the United Kingdom
1968 births
Living people
People from Tehran
People educated at Sherborne School
People educated at Clayesmore School